Malik Ahmed Hussain Dehar is a Pakistani politician who has been a member of the National Assembly of Pakistan since August 2018.

Political career 

Mr Ahmed Hussain Deharr son of Malik Muhammad Hussain was born on September 30, 1965. He has been elected as Member, Provincial Assembly of the Punjab in general elections 2008.His constituency was PP-200 and was an MPA under Prime minister Yousaf Raza Gillani.

He was allocated the ticket from PTI to contest the election from Constituency NA-154 (Multan-I) a few days before the 2018 general election after a large number of party workers put forward his name.

Dehar was elected to the National Assembly of Pakistan as a candidate of Pakistan Tehreek-e-Insaf (PTI) from Constituency NA-154 (Multan-I) in the 2018 general election. He received 74,220 votes and defeated Abdul Qadir Gillani.

References

Living people
Pakistani MNAs 2018–2023
Pakistan Tehreek-e-Insaf MNAs
1965 births